Tomocichla is a genus of cichlid fish native to moderately and fast-flowing rivers along the Atlantic slope of Central America, ranging from the Escondido drainage in Nicaragua to Bocas del Toro in Panama. Tomocichla was formerly included in Theraps (and even earlier in Cichlasoma) and until 2015 Talamancaheros sieboldii was commonly included in Tomocichla.

Species
There are currently 2 recognized species in this genus:

 Tomocichla asfraci Allgayer, 2002
 Tomocichla tuba (Meek, 1912) (Tuba cichlid)

References 

Heroini
Cichlid genera
Taxa named by Charles Tate Regan